The 1980–81 Villanova Wildcats men's basketball team represented Villanova University during the 1980–81 NCAA Division I men's basketball season. The head coach was Rollie Massimino. The team played its home games at Villanova Field House in Villanova, Pennsylvania, and was a member of the Big East Conference.  The team finished tied for 3rd in the conference regular season standings and received a bid to the NCAA tournament before falling to No. 1 seed and eventual Final Four participant Virginia. Villanova finished with a 20–11 record (8–6 Big East).

Roster

Schedule and results

|-
!colspan=9 style=| Regular season

|-
!colspan=9 style=| Big East tournament

|-
!colspan=9 style=| NCAA tournament

Rankings

References

Villanova
Villanova
Villanova Wildcats men's basketball seasons
1980 in sports in Pennsylvania
1981 in sports in Pennsylvania